Azizabad (also Romanized as ‘Azīzābād) is a village in Ghazi Rural District, Samalqan District, Maneh and Samalqan County, North Khorasan Province, Iran. At the 2006 census, its population was 492, in 130 families.

References 

Populated places in Maneh and Samalqan County